Langford is a village and civil parish in West Oxfordshire, about  northeast of Lechlade in neighbouring Gloucestershire. The 2011 Census recorded the parish's population as 349.

Archaeology
Fragments of Belgic pottery found at the site suggest that it was occupied in the Iron Age and abandoned before the Roman occupation of Britain.

Manor
The Domesday Book of 1086 records that a Saxon, Ælfsige of Faringdon, held the manor. In the reign of Edward the Confessor Ælfsige had been a minor landholder, holding two hides of land at Littleworth. After the Norman conquest of England he amassed an estate of six manors totalling 40 hides spread across Oxfordshire, Berkshire and Gloucestershire.

Parish church

The Church of England parish church of Saint Matthew is Saxon. In about 1200 the Early English Gothic north and south aisles were added, and in the 13th century the chancel was rebuilt. Some of the windows are 14th and 15th century Decorated Gothic and Perpendicular Gothic additions. Two flying buttresses were added to the north side of the church in 1574. The architect Richard Pace restored the building in 1829 and the Gothic Revival architect Ewan Christian restored the nave roof to its original pitch in 1864. The tower has a ring of six bells.

Former railway
In 1873 the East Gloucestershire Railway between Witney and Fairford was built past the village. It was operated by the Great Western Railway, which in 1907 opened  Halt  outside the village. British Railways closed the railway and halt in 1962.

Amenities
Langford has one public house, the Bell Inn.

References

Sources

External links
 
LangfordGL7 (village website)
 360° Panorama of Church interiors

Civil parishes in Oxfordshire
Villages in Oxfordshire
West Oxfordshire District